The number of Arabic newspapers in Egypt was about 200 in 1938. There were also 65 newspapers published in languages other than Arabic, such as Turkish, French and English. By 1951 Arabic language newspapers numbered to about 400, while 150 were published in other languages. By 2011, daily newspaper circulation in Egypt increased to more than 4.3 million copies.

The following is a list of newspapers in Egypt:

Newspapers in Arabic

 3yonnews
 Afaq Arabia 
 Akhbar el-Yom
 Akhbar El Hawadeth
 Akhbar El Nogoom
 Akhbar El Riada
 Al Akhbar
 Al Youm El Sabea
 Al Ahali
 Al-Ahram
 Al Ahram Al Arabiya (in various Arab countries)
 Al Ahram Al Duwali (international edition in Europe, USA, Canada)
 Al Ahram Al Masa'y (evening daily)
 Al-Ahram Hebdo in French
 Al-Ahram Weekly in English
 Al Ahrar
 Al Alam Al Youm
 Al Arabi
 Al Balagh
 Al Borsa
 Al-Dustour
 Al Esbou'
 Al Fagr
 Al Gomhuria
 Al Ray Lel Shaab
 Al Kora wal Malaeb
 Al Messa
 Aqedaty
 Egyptian Gazette in English 
Le Progrès Egyptien in French 
 Shashaty
 Al-Jamahir
 Al Jarida
 Al Karama
 Al Liwa
Al Misri
 Al-Masry Al-Youm 
 Al Maarif
 Al Muayyad
 Al Muqattam
 Al Qahira
 Al Shaab
 Al-Shorouk 
 Al Taawin
 Al Tahrir
 Al Wafd
 Al Watany Alyoum 
 Al Zamalek
 AlamelArab الصحف المصرية
 Ash-Shams
 Elaph 
 MasrAlarabia مصر العربية
 Nahdet Mısr
 Naseej News 
 Mada de Masa 
 Rai Al shaab
 Shbab Misr
 Sut El Umma
 Youm7

Newspapers in Armenian
Arev
Housaper
Tchahagir

Newspapers in English
 Egypt Daily News
 Daily News Egypt 
 Egypt Independent
 Egyptian Streets
 Egypt News 
 Egypt Today
 The Egyptian Gazette
 Egyptian Mail 
 Mada Masr
 The Middle East Observer
 Middle East Times

Newspapers in French
 Al-Ahram Hebdo 
 Le Bosphore Égyptien
 Courrier de l'Égypte
 Le Progrès Egyptien

Newspapers in Ottoman Turkish
Mizan

Newspapers in Persian
 Hekmat
 Parvaresh
 Sorayya

Status of Egyptian media
Egyptian radio and TV channels are controlled by the government. However, in the past few years, several private satellite stations have been established in the country.

Egyptian print media can be divided into the following categories:
 Owned by the Egyptian government or the ruling national democratic party.
 Governmental. These publications are not owned by the Egyptian government, but since the Egyptian president appoints the head of the Shura Council (Senate) who is also, de facto, the head of the Higher Press Council that appoints the chair and board of directors of many publishing houses in Egypt, government influence is very strong.
 Belonging to an Egyptian opposition party
 Independent publications, not linked to government or any opposition party

Table of publications

(Notes between parentheses indicate political, religious or institutional affiliations.) 

The independent electronic magazine Arab West Report provides weekly summary translations and reviews of these media in English in order for a Western public to better understand the wide variety of opinions one finds in Egyptian print media.

See also
 Media of Egypt
 List of magazines in Egypt
 List of radio stations in Egypt
 Television in Egypt
 Telecommunications in Egypt
 List of Arab newspapers

References
 Kendall, Elisabeth. "Between Politics and Literature: Journals in Alexandria and Istanbul at the End of the Nineteenth Century" (Chapter 15). In:  Fawaz, Leila Tarazi and C. A. Bayly (editors) and Robert Ilbert (collaboration). Modernity and Culture: From the Mediterranean to the Indian Ocean. Columbia University Press, 2002. , 9780231114271. Start: p. 330.

Notes

External links
 
 

Newspapers, List of
Egypt